5α-Reductase 2 deficiency (5αR2D) is an autosomal recessive condition caused by a mutation in SRD5A2, a gene encoding the enzyme 5α-reductase type 2 (5αR2). The condition is rare, affects only genetic males, and has a broad spectrum.

5αR2 is expressed in specific tissues and catalyzes the transformation of testosterone (T) to 5α-dihydrotestosterone (DHT). DHT plays a key role in the process of sexual differentiation in the external genitalia and prostate during development of the male fetus. 5αR2D is a result of impaired 5αR2 activity resulting in decreased DHT levels. This defect results in a spectrum of phenotypes including overt genital ambiguity, hypospadias, and micropenis. Affected males still develop typical masculine features at puberty (deep voice, facial hair, muscle bulk) since most aspects of pubertal virilization are driven by testosterone, not DHT.

Management of this condition in the context of sex assignment is a challenging and controversial area. Diagnostic availability, local laws, and parental anxiety all play roles in treatment decisions.

The investigation of 5αR2D as a disease has played a key role in the biochemical characterization of the SRD5A2 gene, the 5αR2 enzyme, and DHT in male sexual differentiation.

Presentation

Mutations in the SRD5A2 gene can result in a 46,XY disorder of sex development (46,XY DSD) called 5α-reductase 2 deficiency (5αR2D). The mutations are inherited in an autosomal recessive pattern can be either homozygous or, less frequently, compound heterozygous loss-of-function. Affected males exhibit a broad spectrum of presentation including atypical genitalia (ranging from female appearing to undervirilized male), hypospadias, and isolated micropenis. The internal reproductive structures (vasa deferentia, seminal vesicles, epididymides and ejaculatory ducts) are normal but testes are usually undescended and prostate hypoplasia is common. Males with the same mutations in SRD5A2 can have different phenotypes suggesting additional factors that are involved in clinical presentation. Females with the same mutations in SRD5A2 as affected males (as seen in siblings) are unaffected and have normal female phenotypes and reproductive function.

Virilization of genitalia with voice deepening, development of muscle mass occur at puberty in affected males and height is not impaired. Gynecomastia is uncommon and bone density is normal in contrast to 46,XY DSD from other causes such as partial androgen insensitivity syndrome and 17β-hydroxysteroid dehydrogenase 3 deficiency. Hair on the face and body is reduced and male pattern baldness does not occur.

Mechanism
5α-Reductase type 2 (5αR2) is an enzyme, encoded by the SRD5A2 gene, that is expressed in specific tissues in the male body from fetal development to adulthood. The enzyme catalyzes the transformation of testosterone (T) to 5α-dihydrotestosterone (DHT) intracellularly.  DHT is the most potent ligand to the androgen receptor (AR). Upon binding, the DHT-AR complex translocates from cytoplasm to the nucleus and activates the androgen receptor-regulated genes involved in processes that include male sexual differentiation.

Genetics
Two of three isozymes of 5αR can catalyze the transformation of T to DHT, but it is only 5αR2D that causes 46XY, DSD. 5αR2 is encoded by the gene SRD5A2 which is located on the short arm of chromosome 2 and contains five exons and four introns.  5αR2 consists of 254 amino acid residues with reported mutations at 67 of them with multiple different mutations at some residues.

The first known mutation SRD5A2 was almost a complete deletion which was discovered from analysis of affected males in Papua New Guinean tribe. The majority of SRD5A2 mutations are missense mutations but small deletions, splice junction mutations, and gross deletions were also observed. Mutations result in a spectrum of activity effects ranging from destabilizing 5αR2 to complete loss of activity.

SRD5A2 mutations are inherited in an autosomal recessive pattern. Homozygous defects are more common than compound heterozygous ones. A phenotype-genotype correlation is not known to exist for many of the most common mutations, and affected males with the same 5αR2 mutations have variable phenotypes suggesting other interacting genetic factors that determine phenotype.

Diagnosis
Diagnosis is usually made between birth and puberty. Pseudovaginal perineoscrotal hypospadias presenting with female appearing genitalia and pubertal virilization is the classical syndrome attributed to 5αR2D, but modern diagnostic methods can diagnose the deficiency shortly after birth and recognize the broad spectrum of presentation.

The initial diagnosis of 46,XY DSD is indicated by overt genital abnormality. The objective clinical evaluation of dysmorphic features to diagnose 46,XY DSD for apparent female genitalia include: enlarged clitoris, posterior labial fusion, and inguinal/labial mass. For apparent male genitalia:  nonpalpable testes, micropenis, isolated perineal hypospadias, or mild hypospadias with undescended testis. Family history and prenatal history are also taken into account in evaluation. Karyotyping and SRY gene analysis on samples from peripheral leukocytes will exclude sex chromosome abnormalities. With the determination of an XY karyotype and normal SRY, the differential diagnosis of 46,XY DSD is made with endocrinological measurements of T/DHT ratios (which indicate 5αR2 activity) and precise anatomical imaging since 5αR2D can be difficult to distinguish from other causes of 46,XY DSD (e.g., partial androgen insensitivity syndrome and 17β- hydroxysteroid dehydrogenase type 3 enzyme deficiencies).

The measurement of the serum DHT concentration is challenging since the concentrations are low and DHT has a high level of cross-reactivity. A high level of assay specificity is required to measure concentrations of DHT since serum T levels are generally 10 fold higher than DHT in young males.   Endocrinological tests for T/DHT ratios can be difficult to interpret since the normal ratio level varies according to age and severity of 5αR2 activity impairment. Affected young males of at least pubertal age with normal serum T levels demonstrate elevated T/DHT levels (normal T, lower than normal DHT).  Stimulation with human chorionic gonadotropin (hCG) (alternatively, testosterone enanthate) is required in prepubertal children (with stimulation and samples taken over several days) to increase serum testosterone levels for measurement. Interpreting T/DHT ratios in male newborns is especially challenging due to neonatal testosterone surge and higher than normal 5a-reductase type 1 activity. SRD5A2 gene analysis is recommended for diagnosis in newborns. Broadly, 5αR2D is diagnosed with T/DHT ratios greater than 18 while ratios greater than 30 have been observed in severely affected individuals. 5αR2D can also be indicated by low ratios of 5α- to 5ß- reduced steroids, as measured in urine measured via gas chromatography–mass spectrometry.

Ultrasonography is the primary means for assessing internal reproductive organs for diagnosis while genitography and voiding cystourethrography are used to resolve structures such as urethral and vaginal tracts. The use of pelvic MRI for diagnostic imaging for 5αR2D remains controversial.

Management
One of the most clinically challenging and controversial topics with 46,XY DSD is the practice of "sex assignment" or "sex of rearing". This is especially so in 5αR2D, since most affected individuals have undervirilized genitalia at birth but virilize to varying degrees at puberty.  Historically most 5αR2D individuals have been "raised as females", but later reports show that over half of patients who underwent virilizing puberty adopted a male gender identity thus challenging historical practices.

The goal of sex assignment/of rearing is to facilitate the greatest likelihood of a concordant gender identity in the patient's adulthood. The factors that contribute to gender identity are complex and not easy to report but some factors that contribute include sex chromosomes, androgen exposure, psychosocial development, cultural expectations, family dynamics and social situation.

Female sex of rearing in 5αR2D individuals involves surgical procedures such as childhood gonadectomy (to prevent virilization at puberty) and vaginoplasty. Life-long hormonal treatments as also required for the development and maintenance of female secondary sex characteristics. Male sex of rearing avoids lifelong hormonal treatments and allow for the potential of fertility.  Cryptorchidism and hypospadias must be addressed to prevent damage to the seminiferous tubules that are essential for spermatogenesis and fertility. Some approaches encourage a diagnosis during infancy prior to any gender assignment or surgical interventions.

The intersection of the child's well-being, parental wishes, recommendations of the associated medical team and local laws makes decision making challenging in these cases. The necessity and ethics around consent and deception involved in administering such interventions has been seriously questioned.

Fertility
Spontaneous fertility in 5αR2D affected males is usually not possible (though has been observed) due to semen abnormalities that include reduced sperm counts, high semen viscosity and, in some cases, lack of primary spermatocytes. This supports the notion that DHT has an important role in spermatocyte differentiation. The broad spectrum of presentation is consistent with highly varying sperm counts among affected males. Testicular function may also be impaired by incomplete descent as well as the genetic mutation itself.

Assisted reproduction methods involving sperm extraction and concentration for intrauterine insemination, intracytoplasmic sperm injection, and in vitro fertilization have all demonstrated successful outcomes.

Epidemiology
5αR2D is a rare condition, but has a worldwide distribution. A 2020 study identified 434 cases of 5αR2D across 44 countries including Turkey (23%), China (17%), Italy (9%), and Brazil (7%). The same study also found that genitalia virilization influenced sex assignment while gender change was influenced by cultural aspects across the countries. Molecular diagnosis resulted in favoring male sex assignment in affected newborns.

Many SRD5A2 mutations come from areas with high coefficients of inbreeding, including the Dominican Republic (where people with the condition are called güevedoces – "testes at twelve"), and Papua New Guinea (where it is known as kwolu-aatmwol – suggesting a person's transformation "into a male thing"), and Turkey.

In the Dominican Republic, güevedoces are regarded as a third gender and experience ambivalent gender socialisation. In adulthood, they most commonly self-identify as men, but are not necessarily completely treated as such by society. In the cases in Papua New Guinea, it has been said that the "girl" is shunned when he begins his natural transformation into a male body and socially assumes a male gender role.

History
An autosomal recessive disorder of sex development, described as pseudovaginal perineoscrotal hypospadias (PPSH), was discovered in males in 1961. The main feature of this syndrome was female appearing external genitalia with the presence of bilateral testes and male urogenital tracts in which the ejaculatory ducts terminate in a blind-ending vagina. This disorder was consistent with 5αR2D as the underlying cause as observed in animal models. 5αR2D was confirmed as the cause in humans in 1974, when studies of 24 participants in the Dominican Republic and 2 in Dallas Texas, USA. One of the cases in Dallas began to virilize at puberty and underwent surgery to remove testes and "repair" the apparent clitoromegaly. During surgery, a normal male urogenital tract was observed as well as other features consistent with PPSH. DHT was almost undetectable in cultured fibroblasts from foreskin, epididymis and the presumed "labia majora" whereas in normal males DHT is detected, suggesting impaired DHT formation. Similar conclusions were obtained for participants in a family in the Dominican Republic study in whom high serum concentration ratios of T to DHT and low concentrations of urinary 5a-reduced androgens were observed. This disorder is now known to be due to homozygous or compound heterozygous loss-of-function mutations of the SRD5A2 gene.

Society and culture

Sport
In April 2014, the BMJ reported that four elite women athletes with 5-ARD were subjected to sterilization and "partial clitoridectomies" in order to compete in sport. The authors noted that "partial clitoridectomy" was "not medically indicated, does not relate to real or perceived athletic 'advantage, relating to elevated androgen levels. The athletes were all from developing countries where lifetime access to hormone replacement may prove elusive. Intersex advocates regard this intervention as "a clearly coercive process".

Popular culture
In the Nip/Tuck season three episode "Quentin Costa", it is revealed that Quentin Costa had 5-ARD.

Jeffrey Eugenides' Pulitzer Prize-winning 2002 novel Middlesex is about a young man with 5-ARD. The character was originally born Calliope and raised as a girl, but upon realizing his genetic sex, he transitions into Cal.

Notable people
 Caster Semenya

See also
 Intersex
 Disorders of sexual development, pseudohermaphroditism, and ambiguous genitalia
 Inborn errors of steroid metabolism
 5α-Reductase (I, II)
 Androgen (testosterone and dihydrotestosterone)
 Ambiguous genitalia
 Intersex surgery
 Androgen insensitivity syndrome
 Congenital adrenal hyperplasia

References

External links
 OMIM article
 

Cholesterol and steroid metabolism disorders
Endocrine gonad disorders
Intersex variations